Doce Tentação is a Portuguese telenovela that started airing on TVI on 8 January 2012 and stopped broadcasting on March 9, 2013. This telenovela was authored by Sandra Santos, from Casa da Criação (Creation House), a group of soap opera/series authors of Plural Entertainment. The slogan of this telenovela is "Love that bears fruit, sows envy!". The protagonists are Mariana Monteiro (Esperanca/Ana Clara), Diogo Amaral (Tiago Marques Flor), Pedro Barroso (Miguel Vieira da Silva) and Sofia Ribeiro (Francisa Vieira da Silva).

Synopsis

When Esperança arrives in Ribeira das Flores, one woman, Francisca Vieira da Silva (Sofia Ribeiro), is the first to be opposed to her presence. Rich and unscrupulous, Francisca dominates the town. Nobody talks about it, but almost everyone does what she wants. It is certain that Francisca possesses something that her deceased mother Antónia Santinho Vieira da Silva (Mario João Luís) left her, which allows her to reign over Ribeira das Flores, along with her godfather, the feared Ricardo Sequeira (Marco Delgado). But not even he knows Francisca's trump card, that she has always wanted Tiago. She fell in love with him when she was a teenager, tried to seduce him, but he refused her advances. This hurt her pride as a woman and she has not forgotten it even to this day. Tiago's persistent refusals only make her want him even more. She tries to convince him that his family had nothing to do with the failure of Marques Flor, but Tiago does not believe her and wants nothing to do with her family. Tiago is determined to discover the truth. Against everything and everyone.

Francisca realizes that Esperança is a threat long before knowing the feelings that Tiago begins to have for her. When it is apparent that Esperança is about to steal the love of the man that she has always wanted, Francisca loses her head and tries to remove her rival in any way. She is willing to do anything, from abusing the influence she has over the people in town, to carrying out dangerous and Machiavellian schemes. Francisca swears that Tiago is not hers, but he will also never be Esperança's! She has the support of Miguel Vieira da Silva (Pedro Barroso), her adoptive brother, in her struggle.

Miguel recognizes Esperança's beauty as soon as he sees her. Arrogant and used to every attention by the most beautiful women, he finds her simple and inferior to himself. When Francisca commands him to approach Esperança and find out where she comes from, Miguel "obeys" with resentment. But soon later he perceives she is different from other women and she captivates him more profoundly than he expected. Then he tries to seduce her. Thinking him well-intentioned, Esperança gives what she considers to be a friendship without ulterior motives.

Tiago is infuriated with the two's intimacy, and does everything to warn Esperança of Miguel's true character. And where the rivalry between Tiago and Miguel was already legendary in the town, from this moment on it becomes visceral. A relentless fight starts for Esperança's heart.

Cast
Mariana Monteiro as Esperança/Ana Clara
Diogo Amaral as Tiago Marques Flor 
Sofia Ribeiro as Francisca Vieira da Silva
Pedro Barroso as Miguel Vieira da Silva
Marco Delgado as Ricardo Sequeira 
Paula Neves as Augusta Santinho
Pedro Lima as Gabriel Ventura
Carla Andrino as Manuela de Telles Brito
Cristovão Campos as Bernardo Coutinho
Jessica Athaide as Diana de Telles Brito
São José Correia as Dora
Sofia Nicholson as Maria da Conceição (São) Domingos
João Didelet as Evaristo Nobre
Nuno Melo as Elias Pereira 
Luis Vicente as Jeremias Vila Verde 
Mafalda Teixeira as Gloria
Isaac Alfaiate as Henrique
Tiago Aldeia as Fausto 
Laura Galvão as Ana Luisa de Telles Brito 
Ricardo Sá as Tomé Pereira
Lia Carvalho as Filipa Nobre
Catarina Gouveia as Nuria Freitas
Rui Andrade as Ruben Moreira
Suzana Farrajota as Lígia (The Woman in Red)

Guest Appearance:

Elisa Lisboa as Efigénia de Jesus
Orlando Costa as Adérito Cunha 
Miguel Guilherme as João Coutinho (Father of Bernardo and ex-husband of Celeste)

Special Appearance:

Maria João Luis as Antonia Vieira da Silva (Mother of Francisca, sister of Augusta and lover of Ricardo)
 as Carlos Marques Flor (Father of Tiago)
Sylvie Rocha as Alice Marques Flor (Mother of Tiago)

Child cast:

Simão Santos as Simão Dias 
Bernardo Vasconcelos as Pedro dos Anjos
Beatriz Laranjeira as Clara (Clarinha) Silva

Additional cast:

Adérito Lopes as the Journalist
Afonso Lagarto as Raptor
Alexandra Rocha
Alexandra Sargento
Alexandre da Silva as GNR
Augusto Portela
Bruno Rodrigues as the Photographer
Carlos Saltão as Brandão Andrade
Eduardo Viana
Eurico Lopes as Inspector Mota
Fernando Elias as the Lawyer
Fernando Tavares Marques
Filipe Gaidão
Gonçalo Lello as Inspector
Gonçalo Robalo as Tiago Marques Flor (child)
Inês Stock as Francisca Santinho Vieira da Silva (child)
Isabel Simões
Ivo Lucas as Adérito Cunha (child)
Isaac Alfaiate as Henrique Martins / Diogo Bastos (Supposed boyfriend of Esperança)
Joana Caçador
Joana Hilário
João Loy as Raptor
João Pedreiro
Jorge Silva as António Freitas (Father of Nuria)
José Boavida
Laurinda Gaspar
Leonor Alcácer as Celeste Coutinho (Mother of Bernardo)
Luís Lucas
Luís Romão
Luís Teodoro
Manuel Lourenço
Maria Zamora as Noémia Freitas (Mother of Nuria)
Margarida André
Margarida Martinho as Efigénia de Jesus (child)
Marina Albuquerque
Mário Franco
Marta Gil
Miguel Bogalho
Nuno Porfírio
Olívia Ortiz as Vanessa Cristina Borrão
Patrícia Resende
Paulo Jorge Santos
Pedro Bargado
Pedro Leitão
Pedro Macedo as Paulo (Friend of Filipa and Nuria)
Peter Michael
Ricardo Peres
Teresa Branco

Soundtrack

Trivia
Initially, the soap opera which was going to be called Doce Tentação, changed its title to Escrito no Céu (Written in Heaven) in October 2011, but at the end of 2011 it reverted to its original title.

References

External links
Doce Tentação
 

2012 telenovelas
Portuguese telenovelas
Televisão Independente telenovelas
2012 Portuguese television series debuts
2013 Portuguese television series endings
Portuguese-language telenovelas